This is a list of tunnels in Africa.

Existing

Algeria 

 about 46 railway tunnels

Congo 

 The Congo–Ocean Railway contains the notorious Bamba tunnel.

Ghana 

 Ghana Railway Corporation Decree of 1977 presupposes tunnels

Mauritania 

 Choum Tunnel - replaced by open air deviation

Morocco 

 Only one existing tunnel.
 Bouskoura Tunnel Casablanca

South Africa 

 Chapman's Peak Drive, Cape Town - M6.
 Cogmanskloof Tunnel, Western Cape - R62.
 Hartbeespoort Tunnel, North-West - R104.
 Hendrik Verwoerd Tunnels, Limpopo on the N1.
 Hex River Tunnels - Railway tunnels through the Hex River Mountains of the Western Cape Province.
 Huguenot Tunnel - a toll road tunnel near Paarl, also on the N1.
 J.G. Strijdom Tunnel, Mpumalanga - R36.
 Lang's nek Tunnel, KwaZulu Natal - a disused railway tunnel between Newcastle and Charlstown.
 Old Van Reenen Tunnel, KwaZulu Natal - just off the N3  - S 28° 22.272 E 029° 25.782.
 Daspoort Tunnel - Daspoort Tunnel is a road tunnel on the R55 in Pretoria.
 Overvaal Tunnel (Oogies)
 Watervalboven Tunnel, Mpumalanga - on the N4.

Eritrea 
outside Keren. But it appears that for some reason they didn't think of blowing up the rail tunnels on the Agordat-Keren line

Tanzania 

 TAZARA - 23 tunnels

Tunisia

Zambia 

 TAZARA - 23 tunnels

Proposed

Guinea 

 21 km of tunnel(s) on proposed Simandou iron ore railway.

Morocco 

 Strait of Gibraltar crossing proposed ; to  Spain

Tunisia 

 Strait of Sicily Tunnel to connect Tunisia with  Italy

Finance 

 Tunnels are expensive to build compared to surface tracks, especially for long tunnels due to limited access to the work site.  The London cross city tunnel is reckoned at UKP 68m per km.

Expedience 

 Freeman Gordor

See also 
 List of tunnels

References

External links 
 TunnelBuilder

Africa